American College is the name of:

 American College (Brisbane), Woolloongabba, Brisbane, Queensland, Australia
 American College Dublin, Dublin, Ireland
 American College in Madurai, Tamil Nadu, India
 American College of Education, Indianapolis, Indiana, US
 The American College of Financial Services, King of Prussia, Pennsylvania, US
 American College of Holistic Nutrition, the former name of Clayton College of Natural Health, Birmingham, Alabama, US
 American College of Management and Technology, Croatia, part of the Rochester Institute of Technology
 American College of Mersovan, Merzifon, Turkey
 American College of Monaco, Monte Carlo, Monaco
 American College of Norway, Moss, Norway
 American College of Sofia, Sofia, Bulgaria
 American College of the Immaculate Conception, Leuven (French: Louvain), Belgium
 American College Personnel Association (ACPA - College Student Educators International), Washington, District of Columbia, US
 Anatolia College, Thessaloniki, Greece
 Pontifical North American College, originally known as "The American College of the Roman Catholic Church of the United States", Rome, Italy
 American College, a.k.a. Robert College in Istanbul (previously Constantinople), Turkey
 Regent's American College London

See also
 American International College
 American University (disambiguation)